Deliver Us may refer to:

 Deliver Us (Darkest Hour album), 2007
 Deliver Us (Warlord album), 1983
 "Deliver Us" (The Prince of Egypt), a song from the 1998 film The Prince of Egypt
 "Deliver Us" (In Flames song)